The 37th TCA Awards were announced on September 15, 2021, via an online event due to the COVID-19 pandemic. The nominees were announced by the Television Critics Association on July 15, 2021. The categories were expanded this year to include eight nominees each (with the exception of Outstanding Achievement in Variety, Talk or Sketch, which includes nine).

Winners and nominees

Shows with multiple nominations

The following shows received multiple nominations:

Shows with multiple wins

The following show received multiple wins:

Notes

References

External links
 Official website

2021 television awards
2021 in American television
TCA Awards ceremonies